Graeme Marett (5 June 1938 - 1999) was a Paralympic athletics competitor from New Zealand.  He won a silver and a bronze medal at the 1972 Games in the Discus 2 and  Pentathlon 2 events.

References

External links
 
 

Paralympic athletes of New Zealand
Athletes (track and field) at the 1972 Summer Paralympics
Paralympic silver medalists for New Zealand
Paralympic bronze medalists for New Zealand
Living people
Year of birth missing (living people)
Medalists at the 1972 Summer Paralympics
Paralympic medalists in athletics (track and field)
Wheelchair discus throwers
Paralympic discus throwers
New Zealand male discus throwers